Barrenjoey may mean or refer to:

 Barrenjoey, New South Wales, a headland at the northern end of [alm Beach, New South Wales
 Barrenjoey Road, a road through the Northern Beaches (Sydney)
 Barrenjoey Head Lighthouse, a lighthouse on Barrenjoey headland
 SS Barrenjoey, later MV North Head, a Manly ferry on Sydney Harbour